Come and Rest, stylized C // R, are an American metalcore band from Atlanta, Georgia. The band started making music in 2011, with members, Dan Goehring, Josh Harmon, Noel Alejandro, and Mitchell Garrett. They have released two independently made extended plays, Royal Blood, in 2013, and, Blacklist, in 2015. The band's name is derived from a Bible verse.

Background
Come and Rest is a metalcore band from Atlanta, Georgia. Their members at its inception, in June 2011, was Dan Goehring, Josh Harmon, Noel Alejandro, and Mitchell Garrett.

Music history
The band commenced as a musical entity in 2011, with their first release, Royal Blood, an extended play, that released on February 18, 2013. They released another extended play, Blacklist, on May 12, 2015.

Members
Current
Dan Goehring
Josh Harmon
Noel Alejandro
Mitchell Garrett

Discography
EPs
 Royal Blood (February 18, 2013)
 Blacklist (May 12, 2015)

References

External links
Official website

Musical groups established in 2011
Musical groups from Atlanta
2011 establishments in Georgia (U.S. state)
Equal Vision Records artists